The Wyllys-Haynes Family is a U.S. political family with its roots in the Connecticut Colony.

Members

George Wyllys
Born: 1590 at the manor of Fenny Compton, Warwickshire, England
Governor of Connecticut Colony, 1642-3
Great grandfather of George Wyllys (1710–1796) (sec of state) 
2nd great grandfather of Samuel Wyllys #2
5th great grandfather of Edward Partridge, Jr.

George Wyllys

Born: 6 October 1710 in Hartford, Connecticut
Secretary of the State of Connecticut, 1735–96
Father of Samuel Wyllys #2
Father of George Wyllys #3
Great grandson of George Wyllys (governor)
Great grandson of John Haynes
1st cousin 4 × removed of Edward Partridge, Jr.
Died: 24 April 1796

Samuel Wyllys
Connecticut Secretary of State 1796-1810
Son of George Wyllys (sec of state)
2nd Great grandson of George Wyllys (governor)
2nd Great grandson of John Haynes

John Haynes
Born: May 1, 1594 
Political position: Governor of the Colony of Connecticut, 1639–40, 41-42, 43-44, 45-46, 47-48, 49-50, 51-52, 53-54 (note every other term such as 40-41 someone else held the office)
Married Mabel Harlakenden
His daughter Ruth Haynes married Samuel Wyllys #1 son of George Wyllys
Great grandfather of George Wyllys (sec of state)
2nd great grandfather of Samuel Wyllys
5th great grandfather of Edward Partridge, Jr.
Died: January 1654

Edward Partridge, Jr.
25 June 1833—17 November 1900
Utah Territorial Legislature 1873; Delegate to 1895 Utah Constitutional Convention
Brother of Emily Dow Partridge who married Brigham Young (Governor of Utah Territory 1850-58) of the Richards-Young Family
Brother of Eliza Maria Partridge Smith who married Amasa Mason Lyman (delegate to the 1849 California Constitutional Convention; Mayor of San Bernardino, California)
Great grandson of Massachusetts congressman Oliver Partridge, delegate to the Albany Congress of 1754 and the Stamp Act Congress of 1765.
Double 5th great grandson of Simon Bradstreet (Governor of the Massachusetts Bay Colony) of the Dudley-Winthrop Family
5th great grandson of George Wyllys (governor)
5th great grandson of John Haynes (governor)
Double 6th great grandson of Thomas Dudley (governor) of the Dudley-Winthrop Family
1st cousin 4 × removed of George Wyllys (sec of state)

Sources
 Gary Boyd Roberts, Three New Notable Dudley Descendants, New England Historic Genealogical Society
 Roster of Connecticut Governors

Political families of the United States